Mistletoe and Wine: A Seasonal Collection is a compilation album by British vocal group Mediæval Bæbes featuring holiday songs from previous albums, as well as two new recordings of "The Holly & The Ivy" and "In Dulce Jubilo".

Track listing

 The Holly & The Ivy
 Gaudete
 L'Amour De Moi
 Salva Nos
 Glass Window
 There Is No Rose of Swych Vertu
 Kinderly
 In Dulce Jubilo
 Love Me Broughte
 I Am Eve
 Quan Vey La Lauzeta
 The Coventry Carol
 Undrentide
 Ecce Mundi Gaudium
 Blow Northern Wind

References

Mediæval Bæbes albums
Christmas compilation albums
2003 Christmas albums
2003 compilation albums
Christmas albums by English artists
Classical Christmas albums
New-age Christmas albums